The 1887 Te Aro by-election was a by-election held in the single-member  electorate during the 8th New Zealand Parliament, on 15 April 1887.

The by-election was caused by the resignation of the incumbent MP Charles Johnston; who was replaced by Francis Humphris Fraser.

Results

References

Te Aro 1887
1887 elections in New Zealand
1880s in Wellington
April 1887 events
Politics of the Wellington Region